Tydeus munsteri is a species of mite belonging to the family Tydeidae. This very small oval, eyeless mite is around 250 μm in length with a soft body covered in striations. It has been recorded from various plants in the vicinity of Munster in South Africa including Citrus limonia, Erythrina caffra and Psidium guajava.

References
New species of mites of the families Tydeidae and Labidostommidae (Acarina: Prostigmata) collected from South African plants Magdelena K.P. Meyer & P.A.J. Ryke Acarologia vol I

Trombidiformes
Animals described in 1959
Arthropods of South Africa